The National Athletics Championships of Pakistan is an annual outdoor track and field competition organized by the Athletics Federation of Pakistan, which serves as the national championship for the sport in Pakistan. The championship is held normally in the month of April.

Events 
22 events for men and 20 for women are held.
Track running
100 metres, 200 metres, 400 metres, 800 metres, 1500 metres, 5000 metres, 10,000 metres
Obstacle events
100 metres hurdles (women only), 110 metres hurdles (men only), 400 metres hurdles, 3000 metres steeplechase
Jumping events
Pole vault, high jump, long jump, triple jump
Throwing events
Shot put, discus throw, javelin throw, hammer throw
Combined events
Decathlon (men only), heptathlon (women only)
Relay
4 × 100 metres relay, 4 × 400 metres relay
Long events
Marathon (men only),20 km race walk (men only), 50 km race walk

Editions 

50th edition will take place in 2021 with 14 teams Pakistan Army, Pakistan Air Force (PAF), Pakistan Navy, Pakistan WAPDA, Pakistan Railways, Higher Education Commission (HEC), Punjab, Sindh, Khyber Pakhtunkhwa, Balochistan, Islamabad, Azad Jammu and Kashmir, FATA and Gilgit Baltistan.

Championships records

Men

Women

Notes

See also 
 Athletics in Pakistan
 List of Pakistani records in athletics

References

National athletics competitions
Recurring sporting events established in 1948
Athletics competitions in Pakistan